Georgi Gamkrelidze (born 30 September 1987) is a Georgian-Ukrainian football midfielder who played for the Samtredia.

References

External links
 at mfkzemplin.sk 
 

1987 births
Association football midfielders
Expatriate footballers in Georgia (country)
Expatriate footballers in Slovakia
Expatriate footballers in Austria
Ukrainian expatriate sportspeople in Georgia (country)
Ukrainian expatriate sportspeople in Slovakia
Ukrainian expatriate sportspeople in Austria
FC Guria Lanchkhuti players
FC Halychyna Drohobych players
FC Halychyna Lviv players
FC Samtredia players
FC Stal Kamianske players
Georgian emigrants to Ukraine
Living people
MFK Zemplín Michalovce players
MŠK Rimavská Sobota players
MŠK - Thermál Veľký Meder players
2. Liga (Slovakia) players
3. Liga (Slovakia) players
4. Liga (Slovakia) players
Naturalized citizens of Ukraine
Footballers from Tbilisi
Ukrainian expatriate footballers
Ukrainian footballers